Ambient or Ambiance or Ambience may refer to:

Music and sound
 Ambience (sound recording), also known as atmospheres or backgrounds
 Ambient music, a genre of music that puts an emphasis on tone and atmosphere
 Ambient (album), by Moby
 Ambience (album), by the Lambrettas
 Virgin Ambient series, a series of 24 albums released on the UK Virgin Records label between 1993 and 1997
Ambient 1–4, a set of four albums by Brian Eno, released by Obscure Records between 1978 and 1982

Other
 Ambient (computation), a process calculus
 Ambient (desktop environment), a MUI-based desktop environment for MorphOS
 Ambient (novel), a novel by Jack Womack
 Mark Ambient (1860–1937), pen name of Harold Harley, English dramatist
 Ambiancé, an unreleased experimental film
 MS Ambience, a cruise ship

See also
 Ambient lighting (disambiguation)